The 1979–80 Phoenix Suns season was the 12th season for the Phoenix Suns of the National Basketball Association and at 55–27, the team's best regular season record since the franchise's inception. The Suns defeated Western Conference foe Kansas City in the opening round of the playoffs, marking the first time the Suns had won a playoff series in back-to-back seasons. In the Western Conference Semifinals, the Suns would lose to the Pacific-winning Los Angeles Lakers, who later went on to win the season's championship. The Suns were led by head coach John MacLeod, his seventh season with the team, and played all home games in Arizona Veterans Memorial Coliseum.

Paul Westphal led the Suns in scoring with a 21.9 point-per-game average and earned All-NBA First Team honors, while Walter Davis was second in team scoring with a 21.5 average. Both Westphal and Davis would return as selections to the All-Star Game. Truck Robinson and Alvan Adams provided an inside presence, averaging 17 and 15 points per game to go with nine and eight rebounds each. Robinson would play in just three of the eight Suns' playoff games, however.

Offseason

NBA Draft

Roster

Regular season

Standings

Record vs. opponents

Game log

!!Streak
|-
|- align="center" bgcolor="#ccffcc"
| 1
| October 12
| Golden State
| W 97–89
| Paul Westphal (25)
| Arizona Veterans Memorial Coliseum11,785
| 1–0
| W 1
|- align="center" bgcolor="#ccffcc"
| 2
| October 14
| Chicago
| W 112–102
| Walter Davis (20)
| Arizona Veterans Memorial Coliseum10,039
| 2–0
| W 2
|- align="center" bgcolor="#ccffcc"
| 3
| October 16
| Seattle
| W 102–86
| Alvan Adams (26)
| Arizona Veterans Memorial Coliseum10,253
| 3–0
| W 3
|- align="center" bgcolor="#ffcccc"
| 4
| October 19
| @ Milwaukee
| L 94–95
| Paul Westphal (29)
| MECCA Arena10,938
| 3–1
| L 1
|- align="center" bgcolor="#ffcccc"
| 5
| October 20
| @ Chicago
| L 104–116
| Alvan Adams (32)
| Chicago Stadium12,117
| 3–2
| L 2
|- align="center" bgcolor="#ffcccc"
| 6
| October 21
| @ Kansas City
| L 85–122
| Truck Robinson (21)
| Kemper Arena6,648
| 3–3
| L 3
|- align="center" bgcolor="#ffcccc"
| 7
| October 23
| Milwaukee
| L 108–114
| Truck Robinson (34)
| Arizona Veterans Memorial Coliseum10,538
| 3–4
| L 4
|- align="center" bgcolor="#ccffcc"
| 8
| October 24
| @ Golden State
| W 110–108 (OT)
| Paul Westphal (37)
| Oakland–Alameda County Coliseum Arena6,296
| 4–4
| W 1
|- align="center" bgcolor="#ccffcc"
| 9
| October 26
| @ Seattle
| W 92–86
| Walter Davis (22)
| Kingdome18,514
| 5–4
| W 2
|- align="center" bgcolor="#ccffcc"
| 10
| October 28
| @ Portland
| W 89–88
| Paul Westphal (25)
| Memorial Coliseum12,66
| 6–4
| W 3
|- align="center" bgcolor="#ccffcc"
| 11
| October 30
| San Antonio
| W 142–109
| Truck Robinson (23)
| Arizona Veterans Memorial Coliseum11,489
| 7–4
| W 4
|-
!!Streak
|-
|- align="center" bgcolor="#ffcccc"
| 12
| November 2
| @ Los Angeles
| L 110–112
| Alvan Adams (29)
| The Forum14,344
| 7–5
| L 1
|- align="center" bgcolor="#ccffcc"
| 13
| November 6
| @ Utah
| W 120–107
| Paul Westphal (31)
| Salt Palace6,197
| 8–5
| W 1
|- align="center" bgcolor="#ffcccc"
| 14
| November 7
| San Diego
| L 102–114
| Alvan Adams (23)
| Arizona Veterans Memorial Coliseum11,097
| 8–6
| L 1
|- align="center" bgcolor="#ccffcc"
| 15
| November 9
| Cleveland
| W 110–106
| Truck Robinson (25)
| Arizona Veterans Memorial Coliseum10,911
| 9–6
| W 1
|- align="center" bgcolor="#ccffcc"
| 16
| November 11
| Denver
| W 116–91
| Truck Robinson (26)
| Arizona Veterans Memorial Coliseum11,118
| 10–6
| W 2
|- align="center" bgcolor="#ccffcc"
| 17
| November 14
| Indiana
| W 104–100
| Walter Davis (30)
| Arizona Veterans Memorial Coliseum9,762
| 11–6
| W 3
|- align="center" bgcolor="#ccffcc"
| 18
| November 16
| Portland
| W 98–97
| Walter Davis (32)
| Arizona Veterans Memorial Coliseum11,464
| 12–6
| W 4
|- align="center" bgcolor="#ffcccc"
| 19
| November 18
| Golden State
| L 95–99
| Walter Davis
| Arizona Veterans Memorial Coliseum10,409
| 12–7
| L 1
|- align="center" bgcolor="#ffcccc"
| 20
| November 20
| @ San Diego
| L 110–117
| Walter Davis (23)
| San Diego Sports Arena6,992
| 12–8
| L 2
|- align="center" bgcolor="#ccffcc"
| 21
| November 21
| Kansas City
| W 128–120
| Walter Davis (28)
| Arizona Veterans Memorial Coliseum10,704
| 13–8
| W 1
|- align="center" bgcolor="#ccffcc"
| 22
| November 23
| Los Angeles
| W 126–112
| Paul Westphal (25)
| Arizona Veterans Memorial Coliseum12,660
| 14–8
| W 2
|- align="center" bgcolor="#ccffcc"
| 23
| November 24
| @ Denver
| W 115–101
| Walter Davis (40)
| McNichols Sports Arena13,664
| 15–8
| W 3
|- align="center" bgcolor="#ccffcc"
| 24
| November 25
| @ Portland
| W 87–86
| Walter Davis (22)
| Memorial Coliseum12,666
| 16–8
| W 4
|- align="center" bgcolor="#ffcccc"
| 25
| November 28
| @ Seattle
| L 116–127
| Paul Westphal (30)
| Kingdome28,248
| 16–9
| L 1
|-
!!Streak
|-
|- align="center" bgcolor="#ccffcc"
| 26
| December 1
| Chicago
| W 99–86
| Truck Robinson,Paul Westphal (17)
| Arizona Veterans Memorial Coliseum12,660
| 17–9
| W 1
|- align="center" bgcolor="#ffcccc"
| 27
| December 4
| @ New York
| L 114–118
| Paul Westphal (35)
| Madison Square Garden11,042
| 17–10
| L 1
|- align="center" bgcolor="#ffcccc"
| 28
| December 5
| @ New Jersey
| L 100–115
| Walter Davis (28)
| Rutgers Athletic Center5,162
| 17–11
| L 2
|- align="center" bgcolor="#ffcccc"
| 29
| December 7
| @ Boston
| L 92–100
| Walter Davis (27)
| Boston Garden15,320
| 17–12
| L 3
|- align="center" bgcolor="#ffcccc"
| 30
| December 8
| @ Philadelphia
| L 96–117
| Truck Robinson (19)
| The Spectrum12,051
| 17–13
| L 4
|- align="center" bgcolor="#ccffcc"
| 31
| December 11
| @ Washington
| W 123–99
| Paul Westphal (27)
| Capital Centre8,216
| 18–13
| W 1
|- align="center" bgcolor="#ccffcc"
| 32
| December 13
| Houston
| W 121–113
| Walter Davis (31)
| Arizona Veterans Memorial Coliseum11,841
| 19–13
| W 2
|- align="center" bgcolor="#ccffcc"
| 33
| December 15
| Detroit
| W 126–105
| Walter Davis (32)
| Arizona Veterans Memorial Coliseum11,844
| 20–13
| W 3
|- align="center" bgcolor="#ccffcc"
| 34
| December 19
| Utah
| W 117–99
| Paul Westphal (20)
| Arizona Veterans Memorial Coliseum10,501
| 21–13
| W 4
|- align="center" bgcolor="#ccffcc"
| 35
| December 21
| @ Chicago
| W 127–117
| Truck Robinson (27)
| Chicago Stadium5,706
| 22–13
| W 5
|- align="center" bgcolor="#ccffcc"
| 36
| December 22
| @ Kansas City
| W 115–111
| Paul Westphal (30)
| Kemper Arena8,868
| 23–13
| W 6
|- align="center" bgcolor="#ccffcc"
| 37
| December 23
| @ Milwaukee
| W 106–103
| Paul Westphal (26)
| MECCA Arena10,938
| 24–13
| W 7
|- align="center" bgcolor="#ccffcc"
| 38
| December 26
| Portland
| W 119–99
| Truck Robinson (21)
| Arizona Veterans Memorial Coliseum12,660
| 25–13
| W 8
|- align="center" bgcolor="#ccffcc"
| 39
| December 28
| Kansas City
| W 118–112
| Paul Westphal (31)
| Arizona Veterans Memorial Coliseum12,660
| 26–13
| W 9
|- align="center" bgcolor="#ffcccc"
| 40
| December 30
| @ Los Angeles
| L 105–113
| Paul Westphal (29)
| The Forum15,544
| 26–14
| L 1
|-
!!Streak
|-
|- align="center" bgcolor="#ffcccc"
| 41
| January 2
| @ San Antonio
| L 109–118
| Truck Robinson (29)
| HemisFair Arena8,276
| 26–15
| L 2
|- align="center" bgcolor="#ffcccc"
| 42
| January 5
| @ Houston
| L 110–111
| Paul Westphal (26)
| The Summit9,122
| 26–16
| L 3
|- align="center" bgcolor="#ccffcc"
| 43
| January 9
| Golden State
| W 113–100
| Walter Davis (19)
| Arizona Veterans Memorial Coliseum11,706
| 27–16
| W 1
|- align="center" bgcolor="#ffcccc"
| 44
| January 12
| @ Golden State
| L 96–107
| Walter Davis (19)
| Oakland–Alameda County Coliseum Arena9,547
| 27–17
| L 1
|- align="center" bgcolor="#ccffcc"
| 45
| January 13
| Utah
| W 106–103
| Paul Westphal (28)
| Arizona Veterans Memorial Coliseum10,725
| 28–17
| W 1
|- align="center" bgcolor="#ccffcc"
| 46
| January 15
| @ Denver
| W 107–99
| Paul Westphal (19)
| McNichols Sports Arena13,057
| 29–17
| W 2
|- align="center" bgcolor="#ccffcc"
| 47
| January 16
| @ Utah
| W 115–108
| Truck Robinson (27)
| Salt Palace6,588
| 30–17
| W 3
|- align="center" bgcolor="#ccffcc"
| 48
| January 17
| Atlanta
| W 101–99
| Paul Westphal (29)
| Arizona Veterans Memorial Coliseum12,660
| 31–17
| W 4
|- align="center" bgcolor="#ccffcc"
| 49
| January 19
| San Diego
| W 137–123
| Paul Westphal (30)
| Arizona Veterans Memorial Coliseum12,660
| 32–17
| W 5
|- align="center" bgcolor="#ffcccc"
| 50
| January 23
| New York
| L 109–119
| Paul Westphal (27)
| Arizona Veterans Memorial Coliseum11,504
| 32–18
| L 1
|- align="center" bgcolor="#ccffcc"
| 51
| January 25
| Milwaukee
| W 110–96
| Truck Robinson (23)
| Arizona Veterans Memorial Coliseum12,660
| 33–18
| W 1
|- align="center" bgcolor="#ccffcc"
| 52
| January 27
| Philadelphia
| W 125–118
| Paul Westphal (26)
| Arizona Veterans Memorial Coliseum12,660
| 34–18
| W 2
|- align="center" bgcolor="#ffcccc"
| 53
| January 29
| @ San Diego
| L 121–133
| Truck Robinson (31)
| San Diego Sports Arena11,428
| 34–19
| L 1
|- align="center" bgcolor="#ccffcc"
| 54
| January 30
| Denver
| W 122–114
| Paul Westphal (30)
| Arizona Veterans Memorial Coliseum11,069
| 35–19
| W 1
|-
!!Streak
|-
|- align="center" bgcolor="#ccffcc"
| 55
| February 6
| Kansas City
| W 97–95
| Walter Davis (21)
| Arizona Veterans Memorial Coliseum12,310
| 36–19
| W 2
|- align="center" bgcolor="#ccffcc"
| 56
| February 8
| @ Chicago
| W 113–109
| Mike Bratz (20)
| Chicago Stadium10,403
| 37–19
| W 3
|- align="center" bgcolor="#ffcccc"
| 57
| February 10
| @ Milwaukee
| L 107–109
| Walter Davis (27)
| MECCA Arena10,938
| 37–20
| L 1
|- align="center" bgcolor="#ccffcc"
| 58
| February 13
| Boston
| W 135–134
| Paul Westphal (34)
| Arizona Veterans Memorial Coliseum12,660
| 38–20
| W 1
|- align="center" bgcolor="#ccffcc"
| 59
| February 15
| Washington
| W 116–104
| Truck Robinson (26)
| Arizona Veterans Memorial Coliseum12,660
| 39–20
| W 2
|- align="center" bgcolor="#ccffcc"
| 60
| February 17
| New Jersey
| W 128–98
| Paul Westphal (24)
| Arizona Veterans Memorial Coliseum12,466
| 40–20
| W 3
|- align="center" bgcolor="#ffcccc"
| 61
| February 19
| @ Cleveland
| L 109–128
| Walter Davis (32)
| Coliseum at Richfield5,739
| 40–21
| L 1
|- align="center" bgcolor="#ccffcc"
| 62
| February 21
| @ Detroit
| W 125–116
| Paul Westphal (49)
| Pontiac Silverdome5,317
| 41–21
| W 1
|- align="center" bgcolor="#ffcccc"
| 63
| February 22
| @ Atlanta
| L 104–111
| Alvan Adams (19)
| Omni Coliseum13,150
| 41–22
| L 1
|- align="center" bgcolor="#ccffcc"
| 64
| February 24
| @ Indiana
| W 113–105
| Walter Davis (29)
| Market Square Arena9,174
| 42–22
| W 1
|- align="center" bgcolor="#ffcccc"
| 65
| February 26
| @ Denver
| L 112–121
| Truck Robinson (25)
| McNichols Sports Arena11,149
| 42–23
| L 1
|- align="center" bgcolor="#ffcccc"
| 66
| February 27
| Milwaukee
| L 110–119 (OT)
| Walter Davis (24)
| Arizona Veterans Memorial Coliseum11,683
| 42–24
| L 2
|- align="center" bgcolor="#ccffcc"
| 67
| February 28
| @ Utah
| W 111–101
| Paul Westphal (30)
| Salt Palace6,903
| 43–24
| W 1
|-
!!Streak
|-
|- align="center" bgcolor="#ccffcc"
| 68
| March 2
| Los Angeles
| W 125–115
| Paul Westphal (25)
| Arizona Veterans Memorial Coliseum12,660
| 44–24
| W 2
|- align="center" bgcolor="#ccffcc"
| 69
| March 5
| Seattle
| W 127–111
| Walter Davis (30)
| Arizona Veterans Memorial Coliseum12,660
| 45–24
| W 3
|- align="center" bgcolor="#ccffcc"
| 70
| March 7
| Utah
| W 110–94
| Walter Davis,Paul Westphal (24)
| Arizona Veterans Memorial Coliseum12,245
| 46–24
| W 4
|- align="center" bgcolor="#ccffcc"
| 71
| March 9
| Chicago
| W 113–103 (OT)
| Paul Westphal (32)
| Arizona Veterans Memorial Coliseum11,210
| 47–24
| W 5
|- align="center" bgcolor="#ccffcc"
| 72
| March 12
| @ Golden State
| W 122–113
| Paul Westphal (31)
| Oakland–Alameda County Coliseum Arena6,936
| 48–24
| W 6
|- align="center" bgcolor="#ffcccc"
| 73
| March 15
| @ San Diego
| L 109–120
| Truck Robinson (29)
| San Diego Sports Arena10,635
| 48–25
| L 1
|- align="center" bgcolor="#ffcccc"
| 74
| March 16
| @ Los Angeles
| L 106–128
| Truck Robinson (26)
| The Forum16,587
| 48–26
| L 2
|- align="center" bgcolor="#ccffcc"
| 75
| March 18
| @ Kansas City
| W 112–109
| Walter Davis (25)
| Kemper Arena11,448
| 49–26
| W 1
|- align="center" bgcolor="#ccffcc"
| 76
| March 19
| Los Angeles
| W 112–108
| Paul Westphal (30)
| Arizona Veterans Memorial Coliseum12,660
| 50–26
| W 2
|- align="center" bgcolor="#ccffcc"
| 77
| March 21
| @ Portland
| W 111–100
| Truck Robinson (23)
| Memorial Coliseum12,666
| 51–26
| W 3
|- align="center" bgcolor="#ccffcc"
| 78
| March 23
| Denver
| W 118–102
| Walter Davis (27)
| Arizona Veterans Memorial Coliseum11,705
| 52–26
| W 4
|- align="center" bgcolor="#ffcccc"
| 79
| March 25
| @ Seattle
| L 95–104
| Walter Davis (21)
| Kingdome34,152
| 52–27
| L 1
|- align="center" bgcolor="#ccffcc"
| 80
| March 26
| Seattle
| W 109–99
| Walter Davis (32)
| Arizona Veterans Memorial Coliseum12,660
| 53–27
| W 1
|- align="center" bgcolor="#ccffcc"
| 81
| March 28
| Portland
| W 114–100
| Walter Davis (20)
| Arizona Veterans Memorial Coliseum12,224
| 54–27
| W 2
|- align="center" bgcolor="#ccffcc"
| 82
| March 30
| San Diego
| W 122–104
| Walter Davis (23)
| Arizona Veterans Memorial Coliseum10,807
| 55–27
| W 3
|-

Playoffs

Game log

|- align="center" bgcolor="#ccffcc"
| 1
| April 2
| Kansas City
| W 96–93
| Paul Westphal (23)
| Truck Robinson (14)
| Walter Davis (7)
| Arizona Veterans Memorial Coliseum12,660
| 1–0
|- align="center" bgcolor="#ffcccc"
| 2
| April 4
| @ Kansas City
| L 96–106
| Alvan Adams (22)
| Alvan Adams (12)
| Alvan Adams (7)
| Kemper Arena9,637
| 1–1
|- align="center" bgcolor="#ccffcc"
| 3
| April 6
| Kansas City
| W 114–99
| Walter Davis (22)
| Alvan Adams (20)
| Adams, Davis (7)
| Arizona Veterans Memorial Coliseum11,306
| 2–1
|-

|- align="center" bgcolor="#ffcccc"
| 1
| April 8
| @ Los Angeles
| L 110–119
| Mike Bratz (25)
| Rich Kelley (10)
| Don Buse (9)
| The Forum15,892
| 0–1
|- align="center" bgcolor="#ffcccc"
| 2
| April 9
| @ Los Angeles
| L 128–131 (OT)
| Paul Westphal (37)
| Gar Heard (9)
| Alvan Adams (12)
| The Forum14,286
| 0–2
|- align="center" bgcolor="#ffcccc"
| 3
| April 11
| Los Angeles
| L 105–108
| Walter Davis (28)
| Gar Heard (11)
| Davis, Buse (5)
| Arizona Veterans Memorial Coliseum12,660
| 0–3
|- align="center" bgcolor="#ccffcc"
| 4
| April 13
| Los Angeles
| W 127–101
| Paul Westphal (25)
| Gar Heard (9)
| Buse, Adams (6)
| Arizona Veterans Memorial Coliseum12,660
| 1–3
|- align="center" bgcolor="#ffcccc"
| 5
| April 15
| @ Los Angeles
| L 101–126
| Walter Davis (24)
| Adams, Cook (6)
| Rich Kelley (7)
| The Forum17,505
| 1–4
|-

Awards and honors

All-Star
 Paul Westphal was selected as a reserve for the Western Conference in the All-Star Game. It was his fourth consecutive All-Star selection. Westphal finished fourth in voting among Western Conference guards with 127,409 votes.
 Walter Davis was selected as a reserve for the Western Conference in the All-Star Game. It was his third consecutive All-Star selection. Davis finished fourth in voting among Western Conference forwards with 100,546 votes.

Season
 Paul Westphal was named to the All-NBA First Team.
 Don Buse was named to the NBA All-Defensive First Team.

Player statistics

Season

|- align="center" bgcolor=""
|  || 75 || 63 || 28.9 || .531 || .000 || .797 || 8.1 || 4.3 || 1.4 || style="background:#FF8800;color:#423189;" | .7+ || 14.9
|- align="center" bgcolor="#f0f0f0"
|  || style="background:#FF8800;color:#423189;" | 82 || 1 || 19.4 || .392 || .244 || style="background:#FF8800;color:#423189;" | .870 || 2.0 || 2.7 || 1.1 || .1 || 8.5
|- align="center" bgcolor=""
|  || 81 || 81 || 30.9 || .443 || .241 || .664 || 2.9 || 4.0 || style="background:#FF8800;color:#423189;" | 1.6 || .1 || 7.7
|- align="center" bgcolor="#f0f0f0"
|  || 66 || 14 || 13.7 || .469 || .000 || .806 || 3.7 || 1.3 || .4 || .3 || 5.5
|- align="center" bgcolor=""
|  || 75 || 73 || 30.8 || style="background:#FF8800;color:#423189;" | .563 || .000 || .819 || 3.6 || 4.5 || 1.5 || .3 || 21.5
|- align="center" bgcolor="#f0f0f0"
|  || style="background:#FF8800;color:#423189;" | 82 || 5 || 17.1 || .417 || .000 || .744 || 4.6 || 1.2 || 1.0 || .6 || 5.0
|- align="center" bgcolor=""
|  || style="background:#FF8800;color:#423189;" | 82 || 0 || 13.7 || .446 || .143 || .674 || 2.1 || 1.5 || .9 || .2 || 5.0
|- align="center" bgcolor="#f0f0f0"
| * || 23 || 0 || 16.2 || .506 || . || .783 || 5.1 || 2.2 || 1.2 || .7+ || 5.8
|- align="center" bgcolor=""
|  || 54 || 6 || 13.2 || .469 || .000 || .800 || 2.8 || 1.4 || .5 || .1 || 3.5
|- align="center" bgcolor="#f0f0f0"
|  || style="background:#FF8800;color:#423189;" | 82 || style="background:#FF8800;color:#423189;" | 82 || style="background:#FF8800;color:#423189;" | 33.0 || .512 || . || .667 || style="background:#FF8800;color:#423189;" | 9.4 || 1.7 || .7 || .7 || 17.3
|- align="center" bgcolor=""
|  || 79 || 3 || 16.5 || .422 || .333† || .779 || 2.9 || 1.2 || .6 || .7 || 4.4
|- align="center" bgcolor="#f0f0f0"
|  || style="background:#FF8800;color:#423189;" | 82 || style="background:#FF8800;color:#423189;" | 82 || 32.5 || .525 || style="background:#FF8800;color:#423189;" | .280† || .862 || 2.3 || style="background:#FF8800;color:#423189;" | 5.1 || 1.5 || .4 || style="background:#FF8800;color:#423189;" | 21.9
|}

* – Stats with the Suns.
† – Minimum 25 three-pointers made.
+ – Minimum 50 games played.

Playoffs

|- align="center" bgcolor=""
|  || style="background:#FF8800;color:#423189;" | 8 || style="background:#FF8800;color:#423189;" | 8 || 31.4 || style="background:#FF8800;color:#423189;" | .566† || . || style="background:#FF8800;color:#423189;" | .895^ || style="background:#FF8800;color:#423189;" | 9.6 || style="background:#FF8800;color:#423189;" | 5.8 || .9 || 1.3 || 16.1
|- align="center" bgcolor="#f0f0f0"
|  || style="background:#FF8800;color:#423189;" | 8 || 0 || 21.1 || .512 || style="background:#FF8800;color:#423189;" | .391 || .900^ || 2.5 || 2.0 || 1.1 || .0 || 13.0
|- align="center" bgcolor=""
|  || style="background:#FF8800;color:#423189;" | 8 || style="background:#FF8800;color:#423189;" | 8 || 29.5 || .438 || .385 || .636 || 2.6 || 5.5 || .8 || .0 || 8.5
|- align="center" bgcolor="#f0f0f0"
|  || 7 || 0 || 14.0 || .667† || . || .846 || 3.0 || 1.0 || .6 || .3 || 7.7
|- align="center" bgcolor=""
|  || style="background:#FF8800;color:#423189;" | 8 || style="background:#FF8800;color:#423189;" | 8 || 30.6 || .504 || .000 || .737 || 2.9 || 4.4 || .5 || .1 || 20.8
|- align="center" bgcolor="#f0f0f0"
|  || style="background:#FF8800;color:#423189;" | 8 || 6 || 27.9 || .393 || . || .733 || 6.4 || 1.5 || 1.1 || style="background:#FF8800;color:#423189;" | 1.4 || 6.9
|- align="center" bgcolor=""
|  || style="background:#FF8800;color:#423189;" | 8 || 0 || 15.0 || .387 || .000 || .500 || 3.1 || 2.5 || .8 || .3 || 4.0
|- align="center" bgcolor="#f0f0f0"
|  || style="background:#FF8800;color:#423189;" | 8 || 0 || 18.3 || .432 || .000 || .900^ || 4.5 || 2.8 || 1.1 || .9 || 5.9
|- align="center" bgcolor=""
|  || 3 || 2 || 21.3 || .375 || . || .714 || 6.7 || 1.3 || 1.0 || .7 || 5.7
|- align="center" bgcolor="#f0f0f0"
|  || style="background:#FF8800;color:#423189;" | 8 || 0 || 17.5 || .515 || .000 || .500 || 2.8 || 1.3 || .5 || .6 || 4.8
|- align="center" bgcolor=""
|  || style="background:#FF8800;color:#423189;" | 8 || style="background:#FF8800;color:#423189;" | 8 || style="background:#FF8800;color:#423189;" | 31.6 || .486 || .083 || .875 || 1.3 || 3.9 || style="background:#FF8800;color:#423189;" | 1.4 || .4 || style="background:#FF8800;color:#423189;" | 20.9
|}

† – Minimum 20 field goals made.
^ – Minimum 10 free throws made.

Transactions

Trades

Free agents

Additions

Subtractions

References
 Standings on Basketball Reference

Phoenix Suns seasons
Phoe